MS Gabriella is a cruiseferry sailing on a route connecting Helsinki, Finland and Stockholm, Sweden for Viking Line. She was built in 1992 in Brodosplit, Croatia as Frans Suell for service with Euroway. Between 1994 and 1997 she sailed as Silja Scandinavia for Silja Line.
Gabriella has sister ships Amorella in Viking Line fleet, Isabelle operated by Tallink, and a third one, Crown Seaways, operated by DFDS Seaways.

Concept and construction

Euroway was a concept developed during the latter half of the 1980s by the Sweden-based Sea-Link Shipping. The new brand was planned to operate two state-of-the-art cruiseferries between Malmö in Sweden and Lübeck in Germany via Travemünde in Germany, with the service aimed in particular at conference groups. Sea-link decided to order the ships from Brodosplit in Croatia, which at that time still was part of the Socialist Federal Republic of Yugoslavia. The ships were based on the same design as the Amorella and Isabella that had been built by the same shipyard for the Finland-based SF Line for Viking Line traffic in 1988 and 1989, respectively. The Euroway sisters were designed with a somewhat different layout of public spaces and cabins, as well as an additional cabin deck.

The order for the first ship, Frans Suell, was placed on 28 September 1989, with the delivery date projected in mid-1991. The ship was launched on 23 January 1991, but due to the Croatian War of Independence her construction was severely delayed, and she was not ready for her first sea trials until January 1992. Following her second sea trials in March 1992 Frans Suell sailed to Rijeka for finalization of her construction and to receive the Euroway livery. The ship was finally delivered to her owners on 4 May 1992 and left Split for Malmö.

Service history

1992–1994: Frans Suell

On 16 May 1992 Frans Suell was christened in Malmö by the Swedish opera singer Birgit Nilsson. The following day she set on her maiden voyage from Malmö to Travemünde and Lübeck, with only invited guests on board. On 19 May 1992 she began normal service on the Malmö–Travemünde route, with a daily departure from both ports. The service had a troubled start, as marketing had been difficult due to delays in the construction of the ship. Due to restrictions placed by the city of Malmö on traffic through the city, no trucks could be carried on board, and operating the buffet restaurant on board caused difficulties for the company.

From 1 September 1992 onwards Frans Suell's route was extended to Lübeck for the duration of the northern hemisphere winter season. The call at Travemünde was maintained as the city of Lübeck did not allow cars to be unloaded in the city. Due to the longer crossing times the timetable was altered with departures from every second day from Malmö and Lübeck, with overnight crossings.

On 1 June 1993 Sea-Link Shipping entered an agreement with Silja Line, with the latter assuming marketing and operational responsibility of the Euroway service and ships. The service now became marketed as Silja Line Euroway, with Silja Festival joining Frans Suell as the second ship on the service (the original planned second ship, Frans Kockum, had been even more severely delayed than Frans Suell, and eventually Sea-Link cancelled the order). From the beginning of June 1993 Frans Suell (and Silja Festival)'s route was again shortened to Malmö–Travemünde, with two daily departures from both ports.

With hopes of attracting more passengers, for the 1993–1994 winter season the route was extended into Copenhagen–Malmö–Travemünde–Lübeck from 1 September 1993 onwards, with daily departures from Copenhagen and Lübeck. Due to the low passenger figures on the service and the poor financial situation of Silja Line, the decision was made to terminate the Euroway service on 12 March 1994. Silja Line wished to charter Frans Suell for use on their Turku–Stockholm service, and already on 2 March 1994 she had been chartered to Silja.

1994–1997: Silja Scandinavia

Following the closure of Euroway Frans Suell sailed to the Vuosaari shipyard in Helsinki, Finland, where she was fitted with rear sponsons, refurbished, painted in Silja Line livery and renamed Silja Scandinavia. On 31 March 1994 she entered service on the Turku–Stockholm route. Silja Line's main rivals Viking Line, who owned two of the ship's sisters, were also interested in chartering the ship but thought the price was too high.

As Silja Line's charter agreement for Silja Scandinavia was drawing to a close in 1996, the main funders of Sea-Link demanded that instead of continuing the charter the ship should be sold to the highest bidder. Although Silja Line would have wanted to continue operating the ship, the company was in such a poor financial condition that it could not pay the price asked for the ship. Instead, she was sold to Viking Line on 11 November 1996, with the delivery date planned in April 1997. On 4 April 1997 Silja Scandinavia arrived for the last time in Turku in Silja Line colours.

1997 onwards: Gabriella

After ending her service with Silja Line, Silja Scandinavia again sailed to the Vuosaari shipyard in Helsinki, where she was delivered to Viking Line, refurbished, repainted and renamed Gabriella (the name having been chosen by a public naming competition). On 17 April 1997, Gabriella entered service for her new owners on the Helsinki–Stockholm route. On 30 June 1999 the a call at Mariehamn was added to the service to maintain tax free sales on board. In 1999, 2002, 2003, 2004 and 2005 the ship spent brief periods sailing on Turku–Mariehamn–Stockholm route, in place of the ship normally used in the service. On 23 January 2004 she collided with the harbour ferry Ehrensvärd in the Helsinki harbour, resulting in minor damage to both ships.

Between 5 May 2008 and 27 May 2008, Gabriella was rebuilt at Öresundsvarvet in Landskrona, Sweden, as a part of Viking Line's fleet rebuilding programme. The refit included the removal of the original cafeteria from deck 7 in favour of expanding the tax-free shop, the addition of a games room on deck 7, the addition of a Tapas & Wine restaurant on deck 8, the conversion of the former BBQ-restaurant into an Ella's restaurant, the conversion of the two-storey discothèque on decks 9 and 10 into a new cafeteria, the addition of new cabins in place of the former conference rooms on deck 11, and redecoration of the majority of passenger cabins.

References

External links

 Viking Line official website for Gabriella
  Gabriella at Fakta om Fartyg
 Video Clips of Gabriella (Silja Scandinavia)

Ferries of Finland
Cruiseferries
Ships built in Croatia
1991 ships